Aimo Jokinen (born 2 April 1931 – 21 July 2014) was a Finnish cyclist. He competed in the 4,000 metres team pursuit event at the 1952 Summer Olympics.

References

External links
 

1931 births
2014 deaths
People from Orivesi
Finnish male cyclists
Olympic cyclists of Finland
Cyclists at the 1952 Summer Olympics
Sportspeople from Pirkanmaa